Markku Antero Lehtosaari (born 8 November 1947 in Sääminki) is a Finnish politician. He was a member of the Parliament of Finland from 1987 to 1999, representing the Centre Party.

References

1947 births
Living people
People from Savonlinna
Centre Party (Finland) politicians
Members of the Parliament of Finland (1987–91)
Members of the Parliament of Finland (1991–95)
Members of the Parliament of Finland (1995–99)